Asociación Deportiva Destroyer are a Salvadoran professional football team based in Puerto de la Libertad, El Salvador, and governed by the Federación Salvadoreña de Fútbol (FESFUT).

History
Real Destroyer bought the spot of Isidro Metapán B for the 2013-2014 season to play in the Segunda División.

On January 2, 2014 the club name was changed to Real Tecleño. A campaign lead to a return to the original name, Real Destroyer.

On May 31, 2015 Real Destroyer reached their inaugural final in a contest with side El Roble for the top Clausura place. The first leg ended in 1–1 all draw. The second leg was a comprehensive victory for Real Destroyer winning Segunda División title 5–2 on aggregate.

After a two-week game aggregate tournament, Real Destroyer defeated Guadalupano (champion of the 2014 Apertura title) 3–2. Real Destroyer were directly promoted to Primera División. Jorge Abrego was leading the team as a coach.

On 13 July 2015, the Chilama stadium had yet approve the official games; Real Destroyer sold their spot in the Primera división to C.D. Sonsonate.

Real Destroyer sold their spot in Segunda División to the reincarnated version of Quequeisque; then disbanded.

On August 20, 2020 AD Destroyer purchased the spot of Brujos de Izalco and competed in the Segunda Division .

Honours
Segunda Division: 1
 2015 Clausura

Shirt Sponsorship

Shirt Manufacturer
 Milan (Jaguatic Sportic)

Sponsors
 Ria
 SBO (Renta de Ofincas)
 Alcadia Municipal Del Puerto De La Libertad

Personnel

Management

Coaching staff

List of coaches
  Angel Orellana (June 2013 – December 2013)
  Boris Romero (Jan 2014– July 2014)
  Frank Medrano (Aug 2014 – Dec 2014)
  Jorge Calles (Jan 2015 – Feb 2015)
  Jorge Abrego (Feb 2015 – June 2015)
  Jorge Calles (June 2015)
 Hiatus (July 2015-July 2020)
  Juan Ramon Paredes (August 2020-June 2021)
  Jorge Abrego (June 2021-''Present)

References

External links
 Deportes | elsalvador.com
 Club Deportivo Destroyer :: Estadísticas :: Títulos :: Títulos :: Historia :: Goles :: Próximos Partidos :: Resultados :: Noticias :: Vídeos :: Fotos :: Plantilla :: ceroacero.es
 El Bayern ficha al francés Benjamin Pavard

Football clubs in El Salvador